UFC 259: Błachowicz vs. Adesanya  was a mixed martial arts event produced by the Ultimate Fighting Championship that took place on March 6, 2021 at the UFC Apex facility in Enterprise, Nevada, part of the Las Vegas Metropolitan Area, United States.

Background

The event was headlined by a UFC Light Heavyweight Championship bout between then champion Jan Błachowicz (also former KSW Light Heavyweight Champion) and former UFC Middleweight Champion Israel Adesanya. If successful, Adesanya would become the fourth man to be champion in two divisions simultaneously and fifth fighter overall (after Conor McGregor at UFC 205, Daniel Cormier at UFC 226, Amanda Nunes at UFC 232 and Henry Cejudo at UFC 238), as well as the eighth person overall to win a title in different divisions. This was the sixth time in UFC history that champions in different divisions fought for the same title, following UFC 94, UFC 205, UFC 226, UFC 232 and UFC Fight Night: Cejudo vs. Dillashaw. Former title challenger Glover Teixeira served as backup and a potential replacement for this fight.

A UFC Women's Featherweight Championship bout between the current champion Amanda Nunes (also the current UFC Women's Bantamweight Champion) and former Invicta FC Featherweight Champion Megan Anderson served as the co-main event. The pairing was initially scheduled for UFC 256, but Nunes pulled out due to an undisclosed injury and the bout was postponed.

A UFC Bantamweight Championship bout between current champion Petr Yan and Aljamain Sterling completed the triad of title fights. They were also scheduled for UFC 256, but Yan pulled out due to visa and travel issues, leading to the postponement.

A flyweight bout between former UFC Flyweight Championship challenger Tim Elliott (also The Ultimate Fighter: Tournament of Champions flyweight winner) and Jordan Espinosa was expected to take place at UFC on ABC: Holloway vs. Kattar. However, Espinosa tested positive for COVID-19 in late December and the pairing was moved to this event.

A lightweight bout between Islam Makhachev and Drew Dober took place at this event. They were previously scheduled to meet in April 2016 at UFC on Fox: Teixeira vs. Evans, but the bout was scrapped after Makhachev failed an out-of-competition drug screening, testing positive for the banned anti-ischemic meldonium.

Randy Costa was expected to face Trevin Jones in a bantamweight bout at the event. However on February 16, Costa withdrew due to an undisclosed injury and was replaced by Mario Bautista.

At the weigh-ins, Askar Askarov weighed in at 127 pounds, one pound over the flyweight non-title fight limit. His bout proceeded at a catchweight and he was fined a percentage of his individual purse, which went to his opponent, former flyweight title challenger Joseph Benavidez.

Results

Bonus awards
The following fighters received $50,000 bonuses.
Fight of the Night: Kennedy Nzechukwu vs. Carlos Ulberg
Performance of the Night: Kai Kara-France  and Uroš Medić

See also 

 List of UFC events
 List of current UFC fighters
 2021 in UFC

References 

Ultimate Fighting Championship events
2021 in mixed martial arts
2021 in sports in Nevada
Mixed martial arts in Las Vegas
Sports competitions in Las Vegas
March 2021 sports events in the United States